The index of physics articles is split into multiple pages due to its size.

To navigate by individual letter use the table of contents below.

C

C*-algebra
C-ROT gate
C-number
C-symmetry
C-theorem
C. B. Collins
C. Bruce Tarter
C. Chapin Cutler
C. E. Wynn-Williams
C. F. Powell
C. K. Raju
C. N. Yang Institute for Theoretical Physics
C. Peter Flynn
C. R. Hagen
C. T. K. Chari
C. Thomas Elliott
C. V. Boys
C. V. Raman
CACTUS
CADPAC
CANFLEX
CAREM
CASTEP
CASTOR calorimeter
CCR and CAR algebras
CDHS experiment
CEBAF On-line Data Acquisition
CENBOL
CERN
CERN Axion Solar Telescope
CERN Courier
CERN Neutrinos to Gran Sasso
CERN Openlab
CERN Program Library
CFD-ACE+
CFD-DEM model
CFX
CGNS
CGh physics
CHARMM
CHICOS
CHSH inequality
CIDNP
CKM Matrix
CLAS detector
CLD chromophore
CLEO (particle detector)
CLHEP
CLIO
CLOUD
CMBFAST
CMB cold spot
CNDO/2
CNO cycle
COGEMA La Hague site
COMPASS experiment
CORSIKA
CP-parity
CPT symmetry
CP violation
CR-39
CRAC-II
CRC Handbook of Chemistry and Physics
CROCUS
CRYSIS
CSA (database company)
CTX (explosive-detection device)
CUSB
C band (IEEE)
C band (infrared)
C band (NATO)
C parity
Cabbibo angle
Cabibbo–Kobayashi–Maskawa matrix
Cactus Framework
Cadabra (computer program)
Cadarache
Caesar Saloma
Cahn–Hilliard equation
Calabi flow
Calabi–Yau four-fold
Calabi–Yau manifold
Calandria (disambiguation), three different kinds of physics equipment
Calculating Space
Caldeira-Leggett model
Calefaction
Callan–Symanzik equation
Callendar–Van Dusen equation
Calogero conjecture
Caloric theory
Calorie
Calorimeter (particle physics)
Calorimeter constant
Calorimetry
Caloron
Calutron
Calvin Souther Fuller
Camassa–Holm equation
Camber (aerodynamics)
Camber thrust
Cambridge Structural Database
Cameron Wright (weapons scientist)
Campbell diagram
Canadian Association of Physicists
Canadian Geophysical Union
Canadian Journal of Physics
Canadian Light Source
Canadian Neutron Beam Centre
Canadian Penning Trap Mass Spectrometer
Canadian Synchrotron Radiation Facility
Canard (aeronautics)
Candoluminescence
Canfranc Underground Laboratory
Canonical commutation relation
Canonical coordinates
Canonical distribution
Canonical ensemble
Canonical probability distribution
Canonical quantization
Canonical quantum gravity
Canonical transformation
Capacitance
Capacitance electroscope
Capacitance voltage profiling
Capacitively coupled plasma
Capacitor analogy
Capillary action
Capillary length
Capillary number
Capillary pressure
Capillary surface
Capillary wave
Capture orbit
Carbon-13 NMR
Carbon-burning process
Carbon (journal)
Carbon detonation
Carbon dioxide laser
Carbon nanotube
Carbon nanotube quantum dot
Cardinal point (optics)
Carel S. Scholten
Carey Foster
Cargill Gilston Knott
Carl-Gunne Fälthammar
Carl-Gustaf Rossby
Carl Anton Bjerknes
Carl Auer von Welsbach
Carl August von Steinheil
Carl David Anderson
Carl David Tolmé Runge
Carl Eckart
Carl Friedrich Gauss
Carl Friedrich von Weizsäcker
Carl H. Brans
Carl Hermann
Carl Hodges
Carl Kellner (optician)
Carl M. Bender
Carl Nordling
Carl Pulfrich
Carl Ramsauer
Carl Sagan
Carl Størmer
Carl Wieman
Carl Wilhelm Oseen
Carlo Alberto Castigliano
Carlo Beenakker
Carlo Marangoni
Carlo Matteucci
Carlo Rovelli
Carlo Rubbia
Carlos Chagas Filho
Carlos E.M. Wagner
Carlos Frenk
Carlton M. Caves
Carlton R. Pennypacker
Carminati–McLenaghan invariants
Carnot's theorem (thermodynamics)
Carnot cycle
Carnot heat engine
Carolin Crawford
Carolinium
Carolyne M. Van Vliet
Carreau fluid
Carrier-to-noise ratio
Carrier-to-receiver noise density
Carrier generation and recombination
Carroll's paradox
Carroll Alley
Cartan formalism (physics)
Cartan–Karlhede algorithm
Carter constant
Cartoon physics
Car–Parrinello method
Car–Parrinello molecular dynamics
Cascading gauge theory
Casimir effect
Casimir machine
Caspar Isenkrahe
Cassie's law
Cassini's laws
Cat state
Catadioptric sensor
Catapult effect
Catastrophic optical damage
Catherine Bréchignac
Cathodoluminescence
Cathodoluminescence microscope
Catoptrics
Cauchy's equation
Cauchy horizon
Cauchy number
Cauchy surface
Cauchy–Born rule
Causal dynamical triangulation
Causal patch
Causal perturbation theory
Causal sets
Causal structure
Causal system
Causality
Causality (physics)
Causality conditions
Caustic (optics)
Cavallo's multiplier
Cavendish Professor of Physics
Cavendish experiment
Cavitation
Cavity method
Cavity quantum electrodynamics
Cavity resonator
Cebeci–Smith model
Cecil Howard Green
Cecil Reginald Burch
Cees Dekker
Ceiling (aircraft)
Ceiling level
Celestial spheres
Celor lens
Centauro event
Center-of-momentum frame
Center for Integrated Plasma Studies
Center for Nanoscale Materials
Center frequency
Center manifold
Center of Applied Space Technology and Microgravity
Center of mass
Center of mass coordinates
Center of momentum
Center of percussion
Center of pressure (fluid mechanics)
Center vortex
Centers of gravity in non-uniform fields
Centimetre of water
Central European Journal of Physics
Central body
Central charge
Central field approximation
Central force
Central potential
Centre for High Energy Physics (University of the Punjab)
Centre for Quantum Technologies
Centre for Underground Physics in Pyhäsalmi
Centre line thrust
Centrifugal compressor
Centrifugal force
Centrifugal force (rotating reference frame)
Centrifugal pump
Centrifuge
Centripetal force
Centro Brasileiro de Pesquisas Físicas
Centrosymmetry
Cepheid
Cepheid variable
Cepheid variables
Cepheids
Ceramic flux
Ceramic petrography
Ceramic petrology
Chad Orzel
Chain reaction
Chalcogenide glass
Chalk River Laboratories
Chamberlin–Moulton planetesimal hypothesis
Chameleon particle
Champagne flow
Chandra X-ray Observatory
Chandrasekhar limit
Chandre Dharma-wardana
Change of decay rate
Changes of the length of day
Channel noise level
Channelling (physics)
Chan–Paton factor
Chao Tang
Chaos: Making a New Science
Chaos (physics)
Chaos in optical systems
Chaos theory
Chaotic Inflation theory
Chaplygin gas
Chapman function
Chapman–Enskog theory
Chapman–Jouguet condition
Characteristic admittance
Characteristic impedance
Characteristic mode analysis
Characteristic number (fluid dynamics)
Characteristic state function
Characteristic time
Charge-exchange ionization
Charge-induced voltage alteration
Charge (physics)
Charge carrier
Charge carrier density
Charge conservation
Charge contrast imaging
Charge density
Charge invariance
Charge ordering
Charge qubit
Charge radius
Charge transfer insulators
Charged black hole
Charged current
Charged particle
Charged particle beam
Chargino
Charles's law
Charles-Augustin de Coulomb
Charles Archambeau
Charles Bruce (physicist)
Charles Cagniard de la Tour
Charles Chree
Charles Christian Lauritsen
Charles Critchfield
Charles Drummond Ellis
Charles Fabry
Charles Francis Richter
Charles Frank (physicist)
Charles Galton Darwin
Charles Glover Barkla
Charles Gorrie Wynne
Charles Grafton Page
Charles Greeley Abbot
Charles Guillaume Alexandre Bourgeois
Charles H. Henry
Charles Haldat
Charles Hard Townes
Charles J. Joachain
Charles K. Kao
Charles Kittel
Charles L. Bennett
Charles M. Falco
Charles M. Herzfeld
Charles M. Newman
Charles Panati
Charles R. Bentley
Charles R. Doering
Charles S. Peskin
Charles Soret
Charles Tahan
Charles Taylor (physicist)
Charles Thomson Rees Wilson
Charles Thorn
Charles Tomlinson (scientist)
Charles W. Misner
Charles Wheatstone
Charles Wylie
Charles Édouard Guillaume
Charlotte Froese Fischer
Charlotte Riefenstahl
Charm (quantum number)
Charm quark
Charmed Lambda baryon
Charmed baryons
Charmed eta meson
Charmness
Charpy impact test
Chart datum
Chartered Physicist
Chasman–Green lattice
Chaudhry Abdul Majeed
Cheerios effect
Cheick Modibo Diarra
Chemi-ionization
Chemical Physics Letters
Chemical Vapor Deposition (journal)
Chemical affinity
Chemical beam epitaxy
Chemical force microscopy
Chemical ionization
Chemical laser
Chemical oxygen iodine laser
Chemical physics
Chemical potential
Chemical shift
Chemical thermodynamics
Chemiluminescence
Chen Jiaer
Chen Ning Yang
Chen Yung-Jui
Cheng Chemin
Cheng Kaijia
Cherenkov Array at Themis
Cherenkov detector
Cherenkov radiation
Chern–Simons theory
Cherry A. Murray
Chester Carlson
Chetayev instability theorem
Cheuk-Yin Wong
Chi-Wang Shu
Chi b (3P)
Chia-Chiao Lin
Chia-Hsiung Tze
Chia-Shun Yih
Chiang C. Mei
Chiara Nappi
Chicago Air Shower Array
Chicago Pile-1
Chien-Shiung Wu
Chih-Kung Jen
Child's law
Chinese Journal of Physics
Chinese Optics Letters
Chip-scale atomic clock
Chiral Potts curve
Chiral anomaly
Chiral color
Chiral gauge theory
Chiral model
Chiral perturbation theory
Chiral superfield
Chiral symmetry
Chiral symmetry breaking
Chirality (electromagnetism)
Chirality (physics)
Chirped pulse amplification
Chladni's law
Chlorine-37
Choke (electronics)
Choked flow
Chooz (experiment)
Chord (aircraft)
Chris Adami
Chris Hull
Chris J. L. Doran
Chris Quigg
Chris Sachrajda
Chris Wallace (computer scientist)
Christer Fuglesang
Christiaan Huygens
Christian August Hausen
Christian Christiansen (physicist)
Christian Doppler
Christian Gerthsen
Christian Heinrich Pfaff
Christian Ludwig Gerling
Christian Møller
Christian T. Elvey
Christian Wissel
Christine Sutton
Christoffel symbols
Christofilos Effect
Christoph Cremer
Christoph Helmut Keitel
Christoph Scheiner
Christopher Aikman
Christopher Bishop
Christopher Hansteen
Christopher Isham
Christopher J. Hardy
Christopher Jargocki
Christopher Llewellyn Smith
Christopher Polhem
Christopher Stubbs
Christopher T. Hill
Christopher T. Russell
Christopher Wren
Chromatic aberration
Chromatic dispersion
Chromosphere
Chromo–Weibel instability
Chronology of the universe
Chronology protection conjecture
Chronon
Chung-Yao Chao
Churchill–Bernstein equation
Chézy formula
Circuit noise level
Circuit quantum electrodynamics
Circuit theory
Circular dichroism
Circular motion
Circular orbit
Circular polarization
Circular polarization in nature
Circular polarization of starlight
Circulation (fluid dynamics)
Circulation control wing
Circumhorizontal arc
Circumscribed halo
Circumzenithal arc
Claire F. Gmachl
Clamper (electronics)
Clapotis
Clarence Allen (geologist)
Clarence Zener
Clarendon Laboratory
Clarity meter
Clark Blanchard Millikan
Classical-map hypernetted-chain method
Classical Cepheid
Classical Cepheid variable
Classical Cepheids
Classical Heisenberg model
Classical Mechanics (book)
Classical XY model
Classical and Quantum Gravity
Classical central-force problem
Classical electromagnetism
Classical electromagnetism and special relativity
Classical electron radius
Classical field theory
Classical limit
Classical mechanics
Classical optics
Classical physics
Classical scaling dimension
Classical theories of gravitation
Classical theory
Classical thermodynamics
Classical treatment of tensors
Classical unified field theories
Classification of electromagnetic fields
Claud E. Cleeton
Claude-Auguste Lamy
Claude-Louis Navier
Claude Cohen-Tannoudji
Claude Pouillet
Claude R. Canizares
Claude Wendell Horton, Jr.
Claude Wendell Horton, Sr.
Claudia Alexander
Claudio Bunster
Clausius theorem
Clausius–Clapeyron relation
Clausius–Duhem inequality
Clean And Environmentally Safe Advanced Reactor
Clearing factor
Clebsch–Gordan coefficients
Clemens C. J. Roothaan
Clemens Timpler
Clement John Tranter
Clifford Berry
Clifford Martin Will
Clifford Shull
Clifford Truesdell
Clifford Victor Johnson
Clifford analysis
Climate of Uranus
Clinical biophysics
Clint Sprott
Clinton Davisson
Cloaking device
Cloaking device metamaterial
Cloaking device metamaterials
Cloaking devices metamaterial
Cloaking devices metamaterials
Cloaking metamaterial
Cloaking metamaterials
Clock hypothesis
Clockwork universe theory
Close-packing of equal spheres
Closed system
Closed timelike curve
Closed wing
Cloud chamber
Cloud condensation nuclei
Cloud drop effective radius
Clover (detector)
Cluster (physics)
Cluster decay
Cluster decomposition theorem
Clyde Cowan
Clyde Wiegand
Cnoidal wave
Coandă effect
Coaxial rotors
Cobra probe
Cockcroft Institute
Cockcroft–Walton generator
Code Saturne
Code V
Codex Arundel
Coefficient of friction
Coefficient of performance
Coefficient of restitution
Coefficient of thermal expansion
Coefficients of potential
Coercivity
Coffee ring
Coffin corner (aviation)
Coherence (physics)
Coherence length
Coherence theory (optics)
Coherence time
Coherent backscattering
Coherent control
Coherent information
Coherent perfect absorber
Coherent potential approximation
Coherent spectroscopy
Coherent states
Cohesion (chemistry)
Coincidence circuit
Coincidence rangefinder
Cold
Cold Big Bang
Cold dark matter
Cold fission
Cold fusion
Cold rubber
Cold trap
Cold trap (astronomy)
Cold vapour atomic fluorescence spectroscopy
Coleman–Mandula theorem
Coleman–Weinberg potential
Cole–Cole equation
Colin Franklin (engineer)
Colin Webb
Collective diffusion
Collective dose
Collective excitation
Collective excitations
Collider
Collider Detector at Fermilab
Colligative properties
Collimated light
Collimating lens
Collimator
Collision
Collision-induced dissociation
Collision cascade
Collision detection
Collision response
Colloid
Colloid and Polymer Science
Colloid vibration current
Color charge
Color confinement
Color glass condensate
Color superconductivity
Colored-particle-in-cell
Colorimeter (chemistry)
Colorimetry
Colors of noise
Color–color diagram
Color–flavor locking
Colossal magnetoresistance
Columnar phase
Coma (optics)
Combination tone
Combinatorics and physics
Combined RF trap
Combined gas law
Combustibility
Committed dose
Committed dose equivalent
Committed effective dose equivalent
Committee on the Safety of Nuclear Installations
Common beta emitters
Communicating vessels
Communication physics
Communications in Mathematical Physics
Commutator (electric)
Comoving distance
CompHEP
Compact Linear Collider
Compact Muon Solenoid
Compact dimension
Compact star
Compactification (physics)
Compaction simulation
Comparison of software for molecular mechanics modeling
Compatibility (mechanics)
Complementarity (physics)
Complementary experiments
Complete set of commuting observables
Complex beam parameter
Complex circuit
Complex dynamics
Complex fluids
Complex harmonic motion
Complex lamellar vector field
Component (thermodynamics)
Composite fermion
Composite field
Composite gravity
Composite particle
Compressed fluid
Compressed magnetic flux generator
Compressibility
Compressibility factor
Compressible flow
Compression (physical)
Compression lift
Compton Gamma Ray Observatory
Compton scattering
Compton wavelength
Compton–Getting effect
Computational Materials Science
Computational Science & Discovery
Computational aeroacoustics
Computational chemical methods in solid-state physics
Computational electromagnetics
Computational fluid dynamics
Computational geophysics
Computational magnetohydrodynamics
Computational physics
Computed radiography
Computed tomography laser mammography
Computer Automated Measurement and Control
Computer Physics Communications
Comstock Prize in Physics
Concentric tube heat exchanger
Conceptual physics
Concurrence (quantum computing)
Concurrence principle
Condensation
Condensation (aerosol dynamics)
Condensed Matter
Condensed matter physics
Conditional quantum entropy
Conductance quantum
Conduction band
Conductive coupling
Conductivity (electrolytic)
Conductivity of transparency
Conductor gallop
Cone beam computed tomography
Configuration interaction
Configuration space
Configuration state function
Confocal microscopy
Conformal anomaly
Conformal cyclic cosmology
Conformal family
Conformal field theory
Conformal gravity
Conformal infinity
Conformal supergravity
Conformal symmetry
Conformational entropy
Congruence (general relativity)
Conical pendulum
Conifold
Conjugate depth
Conjugate variables
Conjugate variables (thermodynamics)
Conoscopy
Conservation law
Conservation of energy
Conservation of mass
Conservative force
Conservative vector field
Conserved current
Conserved property
Consistent histories
Constant-energy surface
Constant of motion
Constantin Carathéodory
Constantin Perskyi
Constantin Senlecq
Constantine Pozrikidis
Constantino Tsallis
Constituent quark
Constituent quark mass
Constitutive equation
Constraint algebra
Constructive quantum field theory
Contact (mechanics)
Contact angle
Contact area
Contact electrification
Contact force
Contact image sensor
Contact mechanics
Contact protection
Contact resistance
Contaminated Gaussian
Contemporary Physics
Contiguity
Continuity equation
Continuous wave
Continuum mechanics
Contorsion tensor
Contour line
Contributors to general relativity
Contributors to the mathematical background for general relativity
Control moment gyroscope
Control rod
Control volume
Controlled NOT gate
Controlled aerodynamic instability phenomena
Convection
Convection cell
Convection heater
Convection microwave
Convection zone
Convection–diffusion equation
Convective available potential energy
Convective inhibition
Convective instability
Convective mixing
Convective overturn
Conventional lens
Conventional superconductor
Conyers Herring
Coolfluid
Cooling curve
Cooper electron pair
Cooper pair
Cooperstock's energy-localization hypothesis
Coordinate-free
Coordinate conditions
Coordinate system
Coordinate time
Coordinated flight
Coordination geometry
Copenhagen (play)
Copenhagen interpretation
Copernican principle
Copper indium gallium selenide solar cells
Core-excited shape resonance
Core/Shell Semiconductor Nanocrystals
Core (optical fiber)
Core electron
Core–mantle boundary
Coriolis effect
Coriolis field
Coriolis–Stokes force
Corium (nuclear reactor)
Cornelis Dirk Andriesse
Cornelis Rudolphus Theodorus Krayenhoff
Cornelius Denvir
Cornelius Lanczos
Cornell Electron Storage Ring
Cornell Laboratory for Accelerator-based Sciences and Education
Corner reflector
Cornering force
Corona
Corona (optical phenomenon)
Corona discharge
Corona poling
Coronal mass ejection
Coronal radiative losses
Coronal seismology
Corpuscular theory of light
Corrado Giannantoni
Correlation dimension
Correlation function (astronomy)
Correlation function (quantum field theory)
Correlation function (statistical mechanics)
Correlation sum
Correspondence principle
Correspondence rules
Coset conformal field theory
Cosmas Zachos
Cosmic-ray observatory
Cosmic Anisotropy Polarization Mapper
Cosmic Background Explorer
Cosmic Background Imager
Cosmic Research
Cosmic censorship hypothesis
Cosmic crystallography
Cosmic gravitational wave background
Cosmic infrared background
Cosmic microwave background radiation
Cosmic neutrino background
Cosmic noise
Cosmic ray
Cosmic ray spallation
Cosmic ray visual phenomena
Cosmic string
Cosmic variance
Cosmogenic nuclide
Cosmogony
Cosmological constant
Cosmological decade
Cosmological perturbation theory
Cosmological principle
Cosmology
Cosmos
Cosmotron
Coster–Kronig transition
Cotton effect
Cotton tensor
Cotton–Mouton effect
Cottrell atmosphere
Couette flow
Coulomb
Coulomb's law
Coulomb barrier
Coulomb blockade
Coulomb collision
Coulomb excitation
Coulomb gap
Coulomb potential
Coulomb staircase
Counter-electromotive force
Counter-scanned images
Counter-scanning
Counterfactual definiteness
Counting efficiency
Counts per minute
Couple (mechanics)
Coupled-wave method
Coupled cluster
Coupling (physics)
Coupling constant
Coupling loss
Coupling parameter
Courant–Friedrichs–Lewy condition
Course of Theoretical Physics
Covariant Hamiltonian field theory
Covariant classical field theory
Covariant derivative
Covariant formulation of classical electromagnetism
Cowan–Reines neutrino experiment
Crab cavity
Craig Bohren
Creation and annihilation operators
Creeping wave
Cremona diagram
Crepuscular rays
Crest (physics)
Critical Mach number
Critical Mass (book)
Critical angle of attack
Critical band
Critical dimension
Critical distance
Critical exponent
Critical field
Critical heat flux
Critical ionization velocity
Critical line (thermodynamics)
Critical opalescence
Critical phenomena
Critical point (thermodynamics)
Critical radius
Critical relative humidity
Critical resolved shear stress
Critical size
Critical taper
Critical temperature
Critical variable
Criticality accident
Criticism of the theory of relativity
Crivăţ
Crookes radiometer
Crooks fluctuation theorem
Cross-phase modulation
Cross-recurrence quantification
Cross entropy
Cross fluid
Cross modulation
Cross sea
Cross section (physics)
Crossing (physics)
Crosswind
Crow instability
Crowbar (circuit)
Crown glass (optics)
CryoEDM
Cryocooler
Cryoelectronics
Cryogenic Dark Matter Search
Cryogenic Rare Event Search with Superconducting Thermometers
Cryogenic particle detectors
Cryogenic processor
Cryogenic storage dewar
Cryogenics
Cryomodule
Cryophorus
Cryopump
Cryoscopic constant
Cryotronics
Crypton (particle)
Cryst. Growth Des.
Cryst Growth Des
Crystal
Crystal (software)
Crystal Ball (detector)
Crystal Ball function
Crystal Growth & Design
Crystal growth
Crystal model
Crystal momentum
Crystal monochromator
Crystal optics
Crystal oven
Crystal structure
Crystal structure of boron-rich metal borides
Crystal structure prediction
Crystal system
Crystal twinning
Crystalline
Crystalline solid
Crystallinity
Crystallization
Crystallographic database
Crystallographic defect
Crystallographic group
Crystallographic point group
Crystallographic restriction theorem
Crystallography
Crystallography and NMR system
Crystalloluminescence
Csaba Csáki
Ctirad Uher
Cu-Pt type ordering in III-V semiconductor
Cubic crystal system
Cubic metre
Cumulative dose
Cunningham correction factor
Cuntz algebra
Curie
Curie's law
Curie constant
Curie temperature
Curie–Weiss law
Curl (mathematics)
Current (stream)
Current algebra
Current density
Current density (quantum mechanics)
Current quark
Current quark mass
Current sheet
Current sources and sinks
Current superfield
Curtis Callan
Curtis J. Humphreys
Curvature invariant
Curvature invariant (general relativity)
Curveball
Curved mirror
Curved spacetime
Cuspy halo problem
Custodial symmetry
Cutoff (physics)
Cutoff voltage
Cycles of Time (book)
Cyclic model
Cyclone
Cyclonic separation
Cyclops laser
Cyclotron
Cyclotron radiation
Cyclotron resonance
Cylinder stresses
Cylinderical cloak
Cylindrical multipole moments
Cymatics
Cyril Domb
Cyril Hilsum
Cyril Isenberg
Cyril Norman Hinshelwood
Cyril Sinelnikov
Czesław Białobrzeski
Czochralski process
César Lattes

Indexes of physics articles